The Night Riders is a 1920 British silent Western film directed by Alexander Butler and starring Maudie Dunham, Albert Ray and Alexander Butler. It was one of several films made by the British producer G. B. Samuelson at Universal City in California.

Plot
A Cornish emigrant to Canada battles against cattle rustlers in Alberta.

Cast
 Maudie Dunham as Diana Marbolt 
 Albert Ray as John Tresler 
 "Andre Beaulieu" (Alexander Butler) as Jack Marbolt 
 Russell Gordon as Jake Harnach 
 C. McCarthy as Doctor Ostler 
 Joe De La Cruz as Undetermined Role 
 Goober Glenn   
 William Ryno

References

Bibliography
 Low, Rachael. History of the British Film, 1918–1929. George Allen & Unwin, 1971.

External links
 

1920 films
1920 Western (genre) films
British black-and-white films
1920s English-language films
Films based on British novels
Films directed by Alexander Butler
Films set in Alberta
Silent British Western (genre) films
1920s British films